N. formosa may refer to:

 Neopotamia formosa, an Asian moth
 Netechma formosa, a Brazilian moth
 Nilssonia formosa, a softshell turtle